Juliusz Nowina-Sokolnicki (born December 16, 1925, in Pinsk, d. August 17, 2009 in Colchester, England) was a Polish president and head of one of the two governments which claimed in 1972 to be the successor to the exiled Polish government that was created to replace original Polish government, which fled to Romania in September 1939 at the start of World War II. The legitimacy of his government was disputed.

Nowina-Sokolnicki, who previously held several minor positions such as communications secretary within the Government of the Polish Republic in Exile and was close to President August Zaleski, claimed that Zaleski nominated him as his successor instead of Stanisław Ostrowski. This claim, however, remains disputed, as there claims to be little evidence in support. Most of the emigration as well as the present Government of Poland recognised Ostrowski and his successors as the legitimate Presidents in exile. (Lech Wałęsa accepted symbols of the pre-war presidency from Ryszard Kaczorowski).

Nowina-Sokolnicki is known for establishing the self styled Ordo Sancti Stanislai, an attempted revival of the Polish Order of Saint Stanislaus, founded in 1765.

Nowina-Sokolnicki also used the titles of "Count" or "Prince" even though there is no record of any such titles for either himself or his family, and no proof of his kinship to an aristocratic family bearing a similar name. There is no indication that the noble family ever resided in the Pinsk area in present-day Belarus.

References 

1925 births
2009 deaths
Polish politicians